"Not My Business" is a free-verse poem by Niyi Osundare. It is included in Cluster 2, Poems from Different Cultures, of the AQA Anthology.

See also
"First they came..."

References 

Nigerian poems